{{DISPLAYTITLE:C6H9N3O2}}
The molecular formula C6H9N3O2 (molar mass: 155.15 g/mol, exact mass: 155.0695 u) may refer to:

Cupferron
Histidine (His or H)

Molecular formulas